Chris Gladwin may refer to:
 Chris Gladwin (cricketer)
 Chris Gladwin (engineer)